Phyllops silvai, also known as Silva's fig-eating bat, is a recently extinct species of bat from western Cuba. It is a close relative of the living Cuban fig-eating bat.

Chronology
It lived during the Late Pleistocene.
Radiometric date from a sample of long bones of the extinct barn
owl Tyto noeli - directly associated with the type material of P. silvai - gave an age of 17,406 ± 161 YBP. Calibration of the same sample gave ages from 20,050 to 21,474 YBP.

Diagnosis
P. silvai differs from P. falcatus and another extinct relative, P. vetus, by a longer skull, wider postorbital width and long facial region. Its rostrum is larger and upturned with nares dorsally directed, higher than wide.

References

Prehistoric bats
Pleistocene bats
Pleistocene mammals of North America
Fossils of Cuba
Phyllostomidae